2moro (雙胞胎的初回盤) is the debut EP released by 2moro.

External links
 雙胞胎的初回盤 At Yesasia

2006 debut EPs
2moro albums